Tuas South Incineration Plant is the largest waste incineration facility in Singapore. It was commissioned in June 2000. The plant can incinerate 3000 tonns of garbage everyday. The incineration reduces the waste volume by 90%. The plant occupies 10.5 ha of reclaimed land. It was constructed at a cost of S$890 million. The plant also generate 80 MW of electricity.

See also
Water supply and sanitation in Singapore

References

Power stations in Singapore